Jacques Peuchmaurd (1923 – 21 October 2015) was a French writer, literary critic, and a publisher, winner of the 1966 Prix des libraires.

Biography 
Jacques Peuchmaurd studied history and geography in Paris. During World War II, he enlisted as a journalist in Germany for the bulletin of the French sent on behalf of the [Service du travail obligatoire|S.T.O.]. He was in Berlin at the time of the bombing of the city by the Allies, an episode from which he will draw a book: La Nuit allemande (1967).

After the war, it was for a while aliterary critic for the magazine Arts. He subsequently headed the press service of Éditions Julliard, before being hired by Éditions Robert Laffont, of which he became one of the closest collaborators as a literary director.

As a writer, he was the author of several novels of autobiographical inspiration, including Le Soleil de Palicorna, which earned him the Prix des libraires in 1965 and Le plein été which made him the winner of the Prix Cazes in 1959.

He was 's father

Selected works 
1958: Le Plein Été, Prix Cazes, 1959, La Table ronde, 
1965: Le Soleil de Palicorna — Prix des libraires
1967: La Nuit allemande
1973: Soleil cassé, Robert Laffond,  
1992: Les Vieilles Blessures, Robert Laffond,  
1996: L'École de Brive. Histoire familière et amicale (essay)

References

Bibliography 
2008: L. Bourdelas, Du Pays et de l'exil Un abécédaire de la littérature du Limousin, Les Ardents Editeurs,

External links 
 [http://www.lemonde.fr/disparitions/article/2015/11/04/jacques-peuchmaurd-ecrivain-et-editeur-est-mort-a-92-ans_4803183_3382.html Jacques Peuchmaurd, écrivain et éditeur, est mort à 92 ans] on Le Monde (4 November 2015)
 Décès de Jacques Peuchmaurd on LIvresHenbo (23 June 2015)
 Jacques Peuchmaurd, directeur littéraire et fondateur de l'école de Brive, est décédé on La Montagne'' 

20th-century French non-fiction writers
French literary critics
Prix des libraires winners
People from Seine-Saint-Denis
1923 births
2015 deaths